Saint Gildas the Albanian also known as Gildas the Scot, is a spurious early British saint. Apparently identical with Saint Gildas (known as Gildas the Wise or Gildas the Historian), he was invented in the 17th century to explain away inconsistencies in mediaeval sources.

Life
Gildas was reportedly the son of Caunus, king of some southern provinces in North Britain.
According to legend his father was killed in war by king Arthur.
According to Alban Butler (1798),

Identification with Saint Gildas the Wise
"Gildas the Albanian" was invented by British historians of the 17th and 18th century, including Bishop James Ussher and Alban Butler, in an attempt to explain inconsistencies in references made by historical sources and vitae to the 5th/6th century British writer "Gildas the Wise." This was founded on a belief that Gildas the Wise was born in AD 494 and died in AD 570, and wrote his De Excidio et Conquestu Britanniae between AD 564 and 570. Gildas the Albanian, Butler and others believed, lived much earlier, dying in AD 512.

By 1876, this theory had been dismissed, after it was noted that the details of the lives of the two Saints named Gildas were broadly the same:

Robert Chambers, summing up the invention and abolition of "Gildas the Albanian" in Chambers Book of Days (1883), observed:

Modern historians believe there was only one Gildas, the author of De Excidio, about whom little is reliably known, and that he lived earlier than was supposed by Butler and other 18th century historians: "it is unlikely that Gildas wrote [De Excidio...] before 480/490 or much after about 550".

Notes

Sources

512 deaths
People whose existence is disputed